Marauder is the sixth studio album by American rock band Interpol. It was released on August 24, 2018, by Matador Records. The album was produced by Dave Fridmann and recorded at his studio, Tarbox Road, in Cassadaga, New York from December 6, 2017 through April 18, 2018.

Three singles were released from the album: "The Rover" on June 7, "Number 10" on July 30, and "If You Really Love Nothing" on August 23.

Background
Interpol singer and guitarist Paul Banks revealed in a September 2016 Beats 1 interview that the band would resume writing music in the fall of 2016. They later began holding rehearsal sessions in October. In January 2017, they officially announced that their sixth studio album would be released in 2018 on Matador Records. They took a break from recording the album later in the year so they could commence the anniversary tour for their 2002 debut album, Turn on the Bright Lights. The tour lasted from August to October 2017. They resumed work on the album afterward. In May 2018, it was revealed by the band that the album was in its mastering stage.

During the anniversary tour for Turn on the Bright Lights in late 2017 the band included the song "Real Life" in their encore setlist. Although it was the first song written for the album, the song wasn't included in the final cut. On May 24, 2018, the name of the album was leaked by Pitchfork when it was accidentally included in their list "The Pitchfork Guide to New Albums: Summer 2018". The album's listing was subsequently removed. In June, the band began posting a set of cryptic images on social media. One of the images featured a mural with coordinates printed on it, with the image being captioned "maybe it's time"; these coordinates would lead to Mexico City. They also posted a link to an RSVP page for an event in Mexico City taking place on June 7 at 9:30 a.m. and 11:30 a.m. CDT.

Fridmann insisted on recording Marauder on two-inch tape, a rarity for modern albums, most of which are recorded digitally. Fridmann said: "It's a very different mentality as a musician, when you need to nail the take instead of asking the producer to fix it later." Guitarist Daniel Kessler said: "We liked that we weren't being overly precious with making the perfect guitar take. It was a raw record-making experience."

Release
The album was released on August 24, 2018. Music videos were shot for two of the three singles: "The Rover" and "If You Really Love Nothing". The music video for "The Rover" was directed by Gerardo Naranjo and was shot on location in Mexico City over the course of four days. The music video depicts the titular character as he attracts his first followers and begins to build a cult. The music video for "If You Really Love Nothing" was simpler, directed by Hala Matar and starring Kristen Stewart and Finn Wittrock. It was shot at a nightclub in Los Angeles and follows a young woman as she interacts with people in the club and steals items. 

The album's cover art features a photo of the former U.S. attorney general Elliot Richardson taken by photographer Garry Winogrand. Banks explained the choice of image in an interview, referring to Richardson as a heroic figure, with the photo reflecting both the strength and isolation of the protagonist.

Critical reception

Marauder received positive reviews from critics. On review aggregator site Metacritic, the album holds an average critic score of 73 out of 100, based on 25 reviews. A preview article in Q said that the album was "a continuation of the trio's ever-so-subtle shape-shifting, each new LP adding a fresh dynamic coat to their atmospheric indie-rock". The album was heavily criticized for its production, with Ian Cohen of Pitchfork saying, "[The] new producer doesn’t help energize their increasingly frozen-in-time sound."

Track listing

Personnel
Personnel adapted from album credits.

Interpol
Paul Banks – vocals, bass guitar, rhythm guitar
Daniel Kessler – lead guitar
Sam Fogarino – drums, percussion

Additional musicians
Brandon Curtis – keyboards 
Roger Joseph Manning Jr. – keyboards 

Technical personnel
Greg Calbi – mastering
Dave Fridmann – production, mixing, recording engineer
Michael Fridmann – assistant engineer

Other personnel
Matt de Jong – artwork
Jessica Lord – management
Jamie-James Medina – artwork, back photography
Elliot Richardson – cover art subject
James Sandom – management
Garry Winogrand – cover art photography

Charts

Release history

References

2018 albums
Albums produced by Dave Fridmann
Interpol (band) albums
Matador Records albums
Albums recorded at Tarbox Road Studios